For the airport with ICAO code KGCC, see: Gillette-Campbell County Airport in Gillette, Wyoming, United States.

KGCC (99.9 FM) is a radio station licensed to Gillette, Wyoming, United States. The station is currently owned by Keyhole Broadcasting, LLC.

History
The station was assigned the call letters KXXL on 2002-10-25. On 2008-06-11, the station changed its call sign to the current KGCC.

References

External links

GCC
Classic rock radio stations in the United States